Subramaniya Swamy is a 1994 Tamil-language comedy film directed by Pandiarajan. The film stars himself, Urvashi and Priya Raman. It was released on 26 January 1994. The film is a remake of the Malayalam film Mazhavilkavadi.

Plot

Velayudham (Pandiarajan) and his cousin Valli (Priya Raman) are in love since their childhood. Her father Rathnasamy (R. Sundarrajan) hates Velayudham and looks for a groom for his daughter. One day, Velayudham and Valli try to elope but Rathnasamy finally captures them. Vexed by this misadventure, Velayudham leaves his village to Palani in order to find a job with the help of his friend Kunju Khader (Charle). Kunju Khader turns out to be a pickpocket. In a twist of fate, Velayudham steals a bag. In this bag, there are barber tools and Velayudham becomes a street barber. Soon, Cheena the bag's owner catches Velayudham. Velayudham lies and Cheena brings him to his house. There, Velayudham becomes his apprentice. Cheena's daughter Amudha falls in love with Velayudham. What transpires next forms the rest of the story.

Cast

Pandiarajan as Velayudham
Urvashi as Amudha
Priya Raman as Valli
R. Sundarrajan as Rathnasamy
Charle as Kunju Khader
Mannangatti Subramaniam as Vasu
Loose Mohan as Murugan
Oru Viral Krishna Rao
Shanmugasundaram
C. R. Saraswathi
Thideer Kannaiah as Ahamed
Pramila Joshi as Baagiyam
Pasi Narayanan
Bayilvan Ranganathan as Inspector Azhagappan
Manager Cheena as Cheena
Krishnamoorthy
Janaki as Valli's mother
Radha Bob
Usha Nayar
Dakshayini as Velayudham's sister
S. R. Vijaya

Soundtrack

The film score and the soundtrack were composed by Deva. The soundtrack, released in 1994, features 5 tracks with lyrics written by Vaali.

Reception
Malini Mannath of The Indian Express gave the film a mixed review and said, "probably, in the adaptation, the flavour of the original was lost, because what we have here is only average fare". K. Vijiyan of New Straits Times wrote, "This is not a must-see movie". R. P. R. of Kalki called it a full-length comedy on love triangle and noted that the screenplay is like a stretched spring. He concluded the review saying though the film movies bit of speed in the middle, but incredibly smooth in the beginning and end.

References

External links

1994 films
1990s Tamil-language films
Films scored by Deva (composer)
Tamil remakes of Malayalam films